Pristava pri Polhovem Gradcu is a settlement next to Polhov Gradec in the Municipality of Dobrova–Polhov Gradec in the Upper Carniola region of Slovenia.

Name
The name of the settlement was changed from Pristava to Pristava pri Polhovem Gradcu in 1953. The name Pristava pri Polhovem Gradcu literally means 'manor farm near Polhov Gradec'. The name Pristava comes from the common noun pristava 'manor farm; house with outbuildings and land'. Manor farms were typically found near a manor and were operated by servants of the manor. Settlements with this name and the semantically equivalent Marof are frequent in Slovenia. In the past it was known as Pristawa in German.

Notable people
Notable people that were born or lived in Pristava pri Polhovem Gradcu include:
Anton Rihar (1819–1894), musical instrument maker
Gregor Rihar Sr. (1796–1863), musician and composer

Gallery

References

External links

Pristava pri Polhovem Gradcu on Geopedia

Populated places in the Municipality of Dobrova-Polhov Gradec